John D. Casey (born 1939 in Worcester, Massachusetts) is an American novelist and translator. He won the U.S. National Book Award for Fiction in 1989 for Spartina.

Life
Casey went to school at Harvard College, Harvard Law School, and the Iowa Writers' Workshop at the University of Iowa.
He currently lives in Charlottesville, Virginia. Among others, writer Breece D'J Pancake studied under him.

Casey's papers reside at the Albert and Shirley Small Special Collections Library at the University of Virginia (UVA).

Family
Casey's brother-in-law is Nobel Prize-winning physician Harold E. Varmus.

Casey's father was former Massachusetts representative Joseph E. Casey.

Casey has two adult daughters from his first marriage to novelist Jane Barnes: Nell Casey and Maud Casey. Maud is a published author in her own right, with two well-reviewed novels and a collection of short stories to her credit. Nell Casey is the editor of the essay collection Unholy Ghost on depression and creativity, including essays by herself and her sister, and editor of a second essay collection, An Uncertain Inheritance, by contributors caring for family through illness and death.

He also has two daughters, Clare and Julia, from his second marriage to artist and calligrapher Rosamond Casey.

In 2012, John Casey married social media executive Roberts Browning Fray (who went by Robin Fray Carey professionally), whom he first met when she studied English at UVA in 1976. Casey was widowed on December 17, 2015, when Robin Fray Carey was killed in an automobile accident in Fauquier County, Virginia.

Casey is the uncle of journalist and writer Alex Kuczynski, whose parents are his sister Jane and his former brother-in-law Pedro Pablo Kuczynski, who was President of Peru from 2016 to 2018.

Title IX complaints 
In November 2017, Casey was accused of sexually harassing Emma C. Eisenberg, a graduate of the University of Virginia's M.F.A. program. A second anonymous M.F.A. student filed an additional Title IX complaint at the same time. Several weeks later, a third student, Sharon Harrigan, accused Casey of sexual harassment and gender bias. On November 30, 2017, the university's Office for Equal Opportunity and Civil Rights announced that Casey would not be teaching during the spring 2018 semester, nor would he be advising or mentoring students.

In December 2018, a UVA investigation found sufficient evidence that Casey kissed and inappropriately touched a female undergraduate student in 2001. The investigator also found that, "nearly 30 years ago" (approximately 1989), Casey made a sexual advance toward one of his female graduate students. Ultimately, the disciplinary panel determined that Casey was "unfit for continued teaching responsibilities" and made a unanimous recommendation to terminate his employment. However, Casey retired before the sanction could be carried out.

In March 2019, Casey was found responsible for additional Title IX violations in a separate UVA investigation. Among the supported allegations, Casey used the word "cunt" while teaching, called a student a "sexy Irish pirate", commented regularly on female students' appearances, and showed up uninvited to a female student's house and "was overly critical and hostile to her when she rebuffed him". The panel recommended that Casey be permanently banned from UVA property and made ineligible for paid or unpaid UVA employment.

Awards
 1989 National Book Award for his novel Spartina
 1991 Rome Prize
 1993 "Mildred and Harold Strauss Living" Award from the American Academy of Arts and Letters

Works

Fiction 
 An American Romance, Atheneum (1977) 
 Testimony and Demeanor, Knopf (1979) 
 Spartina, Knopf (1989) 
 Supper at the Black Pearl, Lord John Press (1996) 
 The Half-life of Happiness, Knopf (1998) 
 Compass Rose, Knopf, (2010)

Non-fiction 
 Room For Improvement: Notes on a Dozen Lifelong Sports, Knopf (2011) 
 Beyond the First Draft: The Art of Fiction, W. W. Norton & Company (2014)

Translations

References

External links
 
 "'U.Va. Profiles' Features Award-Winning Author John Casey", UVa Today
 John Casey author spotlight at Random House of Canada

1939 births
Living people
20th-century American novelists
National Book Award winners
University of Iowa alumni
Harvard Law School alumni
Iowa Writers' Workshop alumni
Iowa Writers' Workshop faculty
Italian–English translators
21st-century American novelists
20th-century American translators
21st-century American translators
American male novelists
20th-century American male writers
21st-century American male writers
Novelists from Iowa
Harvard College alumni